189 Squadron or 189th Squadron may refer to:

 No. 189 Squadron RAF, a unit of the United Kingdom Royal Air Force
 189th Airlift Squadron (United States), a unit of the Idaho Air National Guard